Olari may refer to:

Places 
Olarikara, a village in Thrissur district Kerala, India
 Olari, Espoo, a district of the city of Espoo, Finland

Romania 
 Olari, Arad, a commune in Arad County
 Olari, Prahova, a commune in Prahova County

Other uses 
Olari (name), a given name and surname (including a list of people with the name)